Patrick Joseph Cardinal O'Donnell (28 November 1856 – 22 November 1927) was an Irish senior prelate of the Catholic Church. He served as Archbishop of Armagh from 1924 until his death, and was made a cardinal in 1925.

Early life
Patrick Joseph O'Donnell was born in Glenties, County Donegal on 28 November  1855,  a son of Daniel O'Donnell, a farmer, and his wife, Mary (née Breslin). He was one of nine children in a family that claimed descent from the O'Donnells of Tyrconnell.

O'Donnell was ordained a priest on 29 June 1880. He attended Secondary School in Letterkenny, and later studied at the Catholic University of Dublin (1873–75) and at Maynooth. He was ordained to the priesthood on 29 June 1880. In that same year, he was appointed to the staff of St Patrick's College, Maynooth, holding the chairs of Dogmatic and Moral Theology. In 1884, he became dean of the revived post-graduate Dunboyne Institute and in 1885 was awarded his STD. From his desk in Maynooth, he poured out a continuous stream of articles on moral theology and canon law.

Church leadership
He was appointed Bishop of Raphoe on 26 February 1888, making him the youngest bishop in the world at the time and was consecrated by Michael Logue on 3 April 1888 in Letterkenny.

O'Donnell undertook, and completed, a prodigious building project in his diocese - the superbly-sited neo-Gothic (with Romanesque details) cathedral, overlooked by a house for bishop and clergy (1891–1901); St Eunan's Diocesan College (1906); the Presentation Monastery and Loreto schools and an extension to Loreto Convent, all in Letterkenny.

He was appointed coadjutor Archbishop of Armagh on 14 January 1922 and succeeded Cardinal Michael Logue on 19 November 1924. On 14 December 1925, Pope Pius XI made O'Donnell a Cardinal.

O'Donnell motto
As a Cardinal, visiting the Holy See and the Apostolic Palace in the Vatican, he would have been seen the motto In Hoc Signo Vinces that was earlier adopted by the O'Donnell Earls of Tyrconnell in 1603–14. The motto appears prominently placed on the Scala Regia as a motto on a sculpted ribbon unfurled with a passion cross to its left, beneath a window overlooking St. Peter's Square.

An armorial achievement with a cross on the shield and this motto were recorded during the reign of  King James VI & I by the Ulster King of Arms as those of  Rory O'Donnell, 1st Earl of Tyrconnell, based on the earlier adoption of the cross and motto by the O'Donnell rulers, as described in the Lebhar Inghine i Dhomhnaill.

Final years

Cardinal O'Donnell died on 22 October 1927 in Carlingford, County Louth.

Legacy
St Connell's Museum in his home town of Glenties has a display about his life.

References

Sources
 Seventy Years Young, Memoires of Elizabeth, Countess of Fingall, by Elizabeth Burke Plunkett, Lady Fingall. First published by Collins of London in 1937; 1991 edition published by The Lilliput Press, Dublin 7, Ireland .

External links
 

1855 births
1927 deaths
Alumni of St Patrick's College, Maynooth
Alumni of University College Dublin
Irish cardinals
Patrick
People associated with St Eunan's College
People from Glenties
Roman Catholic archbishops of Armagh
Roman Catholic bishops of Raphoe
19th-century Roman Catholic bishops in Ireland
20th-century Roman Catholic archbishops in Ireland